The Distaff Handicap is a Grade III American Thoroughbred horse race for fillies and mares that are four years old or older at a distance of seven furlongs on the dirt run annually in early April at Aqueduct Racetrack in Ozone Park, Queens, New York.  The event currently offers a purse of $150,000.

History

The event was inaugurated on 28 June 1954 at the old Aqueduct racetrack, and was won by Robert S. Howard's British mare Mab's Choice, who was trained by the future US Hall of Fame trainer Charles E. Whittingham in a time of 1:24. Mab's Choice was a 20-1 longshot in the field who had not won a race in two years came through with a late drive to win by  length. 

After the 1955 season the old Aqueduct track was close for reconstruction for a period of four years. During the four years from 1956 to 1959 the event was held at Belmont Park during the summer or late spring.

On Wednesday, 20 April 1960 the event was scheduled back at the new Aqueduct racetrack and 29,195 were on hand to see the odds-on favorite Mommy Dear win by 2 lengths.

The event was run in two split divisions in 1964. This was only time that the event was run in split divisions. 

In 1973 the first year the classification system was enacted, the event was set with Grade III status. 

In 1989 the event was upgraded as Grade II.

The event has been run at a shorter distance of 6 furlongs in several times and on the inter dirt track in 1994 and from 2006 to 2009. 

The event was scheduled for 13 March 1993 but postponed twice due to bad weather before finally being cancelled.

In 2016 the event was downgraded to Grade III status.

In 2020 due to the COVID-19 pandemic in the United States, Aqueduct closed their track and the event was cancelled.

Records
Speed record:

7 furlongs – 1:21.18  Devil's Orchid (1991)  
6 furlongs – 1:09.10  La Verdad (2014) 

Margins:
12 lengths –  Ride Sally (1986)

Most wins:
 2 – La Verdad (2014, 2015)
 2 – Happy Princess (1958, 1959)

Most wins by a jockey:
 4 – Ángel Cordero Jr. (1976, 1983, 1984, 1987)
 4 – Richard Migliore (1997, 1998, 2004, 2005)

Most wins by a trainer:
 3 – Claude R. McGaughey III (1988, 1995, 1999)
 3 – Linda L. Rice (2014, 2015, 2018)

Most wins by an owner:
 3 – Lady Sheila Stable (2014, 2015, 2018)

Winners

Notes:

§ Ran as an entry

See also
List of American and Canadian Graded races

References

Graded stakes races in the United States
Grade 3 stakes races in the United States
Sprint category horse races for fillies and mares
Horse races in New York (state)
Aqueduct Racetrack
Recurring sporting events established in 1954
1954 establishments in New York City